The Benton Spring Fault (also known as the Bettles Well fault) is a right lateral-moving (dextral) geologic fault located in western Nevada.  It is considered an integral part of the Walker Lane.

References
Active Faulting in the Walker Lane
USGS Database

Seismic faults of Nevada